Kristian Forsberg (born May 5, 1986) is a Norwegian professional ice hockey player, currently playing for Stavanger Oilers of the Norwegian GET-league.

Playing career
He started his hockey career with Furuset. But first played in the Norwegian GET-ligaen for Storhamar Dragons from 2005 to 2009, before moving on to Modo in the SHL. After five seasons with Modo in the SHL, Forsberg opted to return to his native Norway, signing with the Stavanger Oilers on June 4, 2014.

International
He's also featured on Team Norway and has participated in the IIHF World Championship.

On January 7, 2014, Forsberg was named to Team Norway's official 2014 Winter Olympics roster.

He was named to the Norway men's national ice hockey team for competition at the 2014 IIHF World Championship.

Career statistics

Regular season and playoffs

International

References

External links

1986 births
Furuset Ishockey players
Ice hockey players at the 2010 Winter Olympics
Ice hockey players at the 2014 Winter Olympics
Ice hockey players at the 2018 Winter Olympics
Living people
Modo Hockey players
Norwegian ice hockey centres
Olympic ice hockey players of Norway
Ice hockey people from Oslo
Stavanger Oilers players
Storhamar Dragons players
Norwegian expatriate ice hockey people
Norwegian expatriate sportspeople in Sweden